Sara Gil de la Vega (born 25 October 1994) is a Spanish handball player for BM Bera Bera and the Spanish national team.

She participated at the 2018 European Women's Handball Championship.

References 

Living people
Sportspeople from Barcelona
1994 births
Spanish female handball players
Handball players from Catalonia
21st-century Spanish women